Angiriai  or Angeriai (meaning 'a place on woods', formerly) is a village in Kėdainiai district municipality, in Kaunas County, in central Lithuania. According to the 2011 census, the village had a population of 153 people.

History
An ancient stone axe has been found in Angiriai. At the beginning of the 20th century there was Angiriai manor and okolica.

Demography

Images

References

Villages in Kaunas County
Kėdainiai District Municipality